Talbott Vineyards is an estate winery in Monterey County, California that specializes in the Burgundy varietals of Chardonnay and Pinot Noir.

History
In 1982, the winery was founded in Carmel Valley by Robb Talbott and his father, Robert Talbott Sr.

Vineyards
Talbott sources from two vineyards, Diamond T and Sleepy Hollow. The Diamond T Vineyard was planted by the Talbotts in 1982 with chardonnay on a mountaintop in Carmel Valley. Sleepy Hollow was first planted in 1972 in the Santa Lucia Highlands, and has a mix of pinot noir and chardonnay. The Sleepy Hollow Vineyard was purchased by Talbott in 1994, enabling them to produce wines exclusively from grapes grown on land owned by them—making Talbott an estate winery.

Reception
Talbott's 1990 Sleepy Hollow Chardonnay was awarded a 100-point score by Wine Spectator in a retrospective tasting in 1997.

References

External links
Talbott Vineyards

  

Companies based in Monterey County, California
Food and drink companies established in 1982
1982 establishments in California
Wineries in California
Carmel Valley, California